David Zinn is a costume and scenic designer based in New York, New York. He has been nominated seven times for the Tony Award for both his costume designs and scenic designs, winning one  Best Scenic Design for a Play award for The Humans and one Best Scenic Design in a Musical award for Spongebob Squarepants . He has over 80 Off-Broadway credits in his lifetime.

Early life 
Zinn was born on Bainbridge Island, near Seattle, Washington. He wanted to be an actor and then moved backstage to start designing in middle school. After using his high school career at Bainbridge High School to work in and around Seattle and Bainbridge Island, Zinn decided to move to New York City. Zinn attended New York University's Tisch School of the Arts for his MFA in Design for Stage and Film where he said he was most influenced by musicals and by avant-garde theatre like the Wooster Group.

Career 
Soon after leaving NYU, Zinn went to work as a costume designer for regional theater. After a big break at Santa Fe Opera, which featured his scenic and costume designs, he became known for both aspects of his work. He then went on to work in several Off-Broadway theater for years. He also worked closely with Target Margin Theater Company, headed by David Herskovits and graduate school friend Lenore Doxsee.

In 2010 Zinn worked on Broadway with his costume designs for Xanadu. He then went on to design costumes on Broadway for A Tale of Two Cities, In the Next Room (or The Vibrator Play), Good People, Bengal Tiger at the Baghdad Zoo, Other Desert Cities, The Other Place, Picnic, Rocky, Airline Highway, and An Act of God as well as scenic designs for The Realistic Joneses, Violet, The Real Thing, The Humans, and Present Laughter, and scenic and costume designs for Seminar, The Last Ship, Fun Home, Amélie, and SpongeBob SquarePants: The Musical.

Awards and nominations

Theater 
Source:

References

External links 
David Zinn Internet Broadway database

American scenic designers
Broadway set designers
Tony Award winners
Year of birth missing (living people)
Living people
People from Bainbridge Island, Washington
Tisch School of the Arts alumni
Drama Desk Award winners